Lieutenant Ralph Bunbury (died 15 August 1808), of the 95th Rifles, is known for having been the first British Army officer casualty in the Peninsular war.

Bunbury was killed at Óbidos, Portugal.

References 

 Napoleon Guide – UK officer casualty roll

1808 deaths
Rifle Brigade officers
British Army personnel of the Peninsular War
British military personnel killed in action in the Napoleonic Wars
Year of birth unknown